Kim Louise Medcalf (born 8 December 1973) is an English actress and singer. She is best known for portraying the role of Sam Mitchell in the long-running BBC soap opera EastEnders, between 2002 and 2005 and from 2022 onwards.

Career

EastEnders
In late 2001, Medcalf took over the role of Sam Mitchell from recovering-addict Danniella Westbrook. She filmed her first scenes with Barbara Windsor in Spain, which aired in January 2002. She won the best newcomer award in 2002. Medcalf opted to leave EastEnders in 2005 along with co-star Michelle Ryan, who played Zoe Slater. Medcalf's final scenes were filmed in September 2005 and screened in November of that year. Her character escaped imprisonment as an accessory to the murder of Den Watts and departed Walford to join her brother, Grant Mitchell, in Brazil. Her final scenes aired on 17 November 2005. The role was awarded back to Westbrook in 2009, with producer Diederick Santer opting to bring the original actress back for a short storyline later that year.

In January 2022, it was announced that Medcalf would reprise the role of Sam after nearly 17 years, taking over from Westbrook once again. She filmed her return scenes in February 2022. Her return scenes aired in the United Kingdom on 18 April 2022.

Other work
Medcalf's post-EastEnders work included a role in a dramatic staged reading of The Penelopiad directed by Phyllida Lloyd at St James's Church, Piccadilly on 23 October 2005, appearances for Children in Need on 18 November 2005 and in South Pacific at the Symphony Hall on 29 & 30 November 2005. In Spring 2006, she undertook a four-month run in the revival of Hay Fever at the Theatre Royal Haymarket alongside Judi Dench.

Medcalf was the host of the Mitchells Weekend on the UKTV Gold network. On 23 January 2007, she appeared in an episode of BBC's The Afternoon Play called Death Becomes Him. In February and March 2007, Medcalf appeared as the "guest star" in a short UK tour of the West end hit The Play What I Wrote. On 2 April 2007, Medcalf took over the role of Sally Bowles from Anna Maxwell Martin in Rufus Norris' revival of Cabaret at the Lyric Theatre in the West End.

From 25 February until 1 March 2008, Medcalf appeared in a run of The Vagina Monologues at the New Victoria Theatre, Woking, alongside Sue Holderness and Shobna Gulati. In March 2008, she appeared in an episode of The Fixer for ITV1, and then played a lead role in Harley Street, a primetime series for ITV1. In early 2009, she returned to The Vagina Monologues, this time in Nottingham,

Medcalf appeared in two episodes of BBC One drama Missing in 2010. Medcalf made her London stage return in 2015 when she appeared in Ruby in the Dust'''s production of Gatsby. Medcalf appeared in three episodes of BBC Two drama Collateral written by David Hare in 2018.

Singing
Medcalf is a mezzo-soprano. In 2003, she showcased her singing ability during the EastEnders Christmas Party TV special, where she sang "All I Want For Christmas Is You". Medcalf was invited to join the students of the 2005 Comic Relief does Fame Academy. She performed songs including "Don't Know Why" and "Perfect". The judges initially struggled with her performances but eventually she prevailed; helped by a performance of Delta Goodrem's "Born to Try" Medcalf finished in second place behind Radio One's Edith Bowman.

On 11 September 2005, Medcalf performed at London's Hyde Park when she took part in the BBC Family Prom; performing "Over the Rainbow" accompanied by the BBC Orchestra. On 16 July 2006, she sang at Love letter to Dan'', a Gala tribute to Dan Crawford, the late founder of the King's Head Theatre.

Personal life
Medcalf is married and has two children.

Filmography

Theatre credits

Awards and nominations

References

External links
 

1973 births
Living people
English stage actresses
English television actresses
English soap opera actresses
People from Bromley